Garney Holding Company is a provider of water and wastewater piping systems in the United States with a construction volume of $347 million in 2008. It is based out of Kansas City, Missouri.

History
Charles Garney founded Garney Construction in 1961 as a pipeline and utility construction company. Over the next two decades it also became a contractor in water and wastewater systems. In 2001 the company acquired Grimm Construction, a contractor with operations in Colorado and Arizona.

References 

Companies based in Kansas City, Missouri
Waste management companies of the United States